The Union County Light Rail was a proposed light rail system connecting Newark Airport to midtown Elizabeth, New Jersey.

Project details and status
The Union County Light Rail was originally proposed as the third "minimum operating segment" (MOS-3) of the Newark-Elizabeth Rail Link (NERL).

The first section of the NERL project became known as the Broad Street Line.  This section, which links Broad Street Station in Newark with Penn Station in Newark, opened in July 2006. The second section would have linked Newark Penn Station and Newark Airport.    

The Union County Light Rail would have had eight or nine stations in Elizabeth, one at Newark Airport and possible future stations in other towns. Further extension along the right-of-way westward to Cranford or points further west on the Raritan Valley Line was also forwarded by citizen groups. 

In 2006, NJ Transit removed Union County Light Rail from its list of candidate projects in its Capital Improvement Program, effectively ending the project.

Proposed station list 
AirTrain Newark at parking lot P2
North Avenue
Kapkowski Road
Jersey Gardens
Ferry Terminal (ferry to New York City)
Singer Station (possible station)
Third Street/Elizabethport
Division Street
Spring Street (U.S. Route 1/9)
Midtown Station - connections with the Northeast Corridor Line

Proposed extension stations 
 Elmora 
 Lorraine 
 Roselle   
Cranford Station

The first three were former CNJ station locations.

Union go bus expressway
The Union go bus expressway is a proposed bus rapid transit system between Garwood and the airport via Midtown Elizabeth which includes routing elements of the light rail plan.

References

Johnson, Gary.  Union County, NJ: Elizabeth-to-Newark Airport light rail project under way.  August 8, 2005.

External links
NJTransit Union County Light Rail

Transportation in Elizabeth, New Jersey
Light rail in New Jersey
NJ Transit Rail Operations
New Jersey streetcar lines